Raja Gosavi (1925-1998) was an Indian film and theatre actor, in Hindi and Marathi.

Stage career
Gosavi acted in the role of Natsamrat in noted Marathi playwright Kusumagraj’s iconic & milestone Marathi play "Natsamrat" after Dr. Shriram Lagoo.

Movie career
Gosavi had made his film debut in Datta Dharmadhikari's 'Akher Jamla' in 1952 with Sharad Talwalkar (it was his debut too).
Gosavi worked as a ticket-seller at Bhanuvilas Talkies, Pune for a few years and his film 'Lakhachi Goshta' opened there, which he promoted by selling the tickets both at the counter and in black.
Raja Gosavi also plays lead role in one of the most famous play in Marathi "Soujanyachi Aishi Taishi".

List of Movies

 1952 	Akher Jamla
 1952 	Chimani Pakhara
 1952 	Ek Hota Raja
 1952 	Lakhachi Gosht
 1953 	Bolaveta Dhani
 1953 	Mahatma (Marathi)
 1953 	Saubhagya
 1954 	Baby
 1954 	In Min Sadeteen
 1954 	Purushachi Jaat
 1954 	Shubh Mangal
 1955 	Ganget Ghod Nahl
 1955 	Mi Tulas Tujhya Angani
 1955 	Punavechi Raat
 1956 	Aandhala Magto Ek Dola
 1956 	Devghar
 1956 	Deesat Tasa Nasat
 1956 	Gaant Padali Takaa Takaa
 1956 	Jagaavegali Gosht
 1956 	Kaahi Khara Naahi
 1956 	Pasant Aahe Moolgee
 1956 	Raanpakhar
 1957 	Aaliya Bhogaasi
 1957 	Dev Jaagaa Aahe
 1957 	Gharch Zaala Thod
 1957 	Zaakli Moot
 1957 	Navraa Manoo Naye Aaplaa
 1957 	Utavala Narad
 1957 	Jhal Gel Visrun Ja
 1958 	Don Ghadicha Daw
 1958 	Guruchi Vidhya Gurula
 1958 	Matevin Baal
 1958 	Raja Gosavichi Gosta
 1958 	Sant Changdeo
 1958 	Yanda Kartvya Aahe
 1959 	Rajmanya Rajsree
 1959 	Yala Jivan Ayse Nav
 1960 	Jo Huwa So Bhool Ja
 1960 	Kanyadaan
 1960 	Lagnala Jato Me
 1960 	Paishacha Paus
 1960 	Sangat Jadli Tuzhi An Mazhi
 1960 	Adhi Kalash Mag Paya
 1960 	Baap Majha Bramhachari
 1960 	Bhagya Laxmi
 1960 	Chimanyanchi Shala
 1960 	Priti Vivah
 1960 	Soniyachi Paule
 1960  Jagachya Pathivar
 1960 	Vardakshina
 1960 	Ek Don Teen
 1960 	Shriman Balasaheb
 1960 	Avghachi Sansar
 1960 	Bhairavi (Marathi)
 1962 	Private Secretary
 1964 	Waat Chuklele Nawre
 1965 	Kama Poorta Mama
 1965 	Sudharlelya Bayka
 1966 	Ati Shahana Tyacha
 1966 	Chala Utha Lagn Kara
 1966 	Gurukilli
 1966 	Sheras Sawasher
 1966 	Tuch Majhi Wahini
 1967 	Daiva Janile Kuni
 1967 	Kaka Mala Wachawa
 1967 	Shreemant Mehuna Pahije
 1968 	Baai Mothi Bhagyachi
 1968 	Yethe Shahane Rahtaat
 1969 	Janaki
 1971 	Aasel Maza Hari
 1973 	Pinjra
 1975 	Ya Sukhanno Ya
 1976  Ha Khel Savalyancha
 1977 	Navara Maja Brahmachari
 1977 	Asala Navra Nako Ga Baai
 1979 	Astha Vinayak
 1979 	Did Shahne
 1981 	Manacha Kunku
 1981 	Totaya Aamadar
 1988 	Pandharichi Waari
 1990 	Ghabraicha Nahi

Recognition
Raja Gosavi Road in T.M.V. Colony, Pune has been named in his honour.

Personal life
He is the father of Indian actor Shama Deshpande.

References

External links
 

1925 births
Indian male film actors
Indian male stage actors
Male actors in Marathi cinema
Male actors in Marathi theatre
1998 deaths